Paul Revere Dick (January 7, 1938 – October 4, 2014) was an American musician, best known for being the leader, keyboardist and (by dropping his last name to create the stage name) namesake of Paul Revere & the Raiders. 

The band became notable for a string of hits (they claim 23 straight) from the early 1960s to the early 1970s and thrust Revere into the position of a celebrity.

Career

Paul Revere & the Raiders
Dick was born in Harvard, Nebraska. He was the "idea man" behind the group.  Even before the group, he was convinced there was a place for a combination of music and humor after seeing Spike Jones & His City Slickers.  After taking piano lessons, he emulated the style of Jerry Lee Lewis.  Dick grew up on a farm near Boise, Idaho.  After attending barber college, he had opened a barbershop and a drive-in restaurant in Caldwell, Idaho.  While picking up hamburger buns from a local bakery he met teenaged Mark Lindsay.  The two became the foundation of the band in 1959.

The band originally started calling themselves the Downbeats.  When they started recording, record company executives disliked the name and they took their name as an embellishment from his name. He had the band dress in Revolutionary War uniforms, giving the band a distinctive look.

Revere was the energetic comic relief, the madman of rock and roll, in contrast to the teen idol look of Lindsay.  He pushed for elements of showmanship including having the band's guitarist, originally Drake Levin, and bassist, originally Phil Volk, perform synchronized dance moves.

Revere announced his retirement from the music business at the end of 1976, and split up the Raiders. Paul’s retirement would be short, as he back with a new cast of Raiders by 1978.

Where The Action Is

Starting in 1965, the band became the house band for the Dick Clark ABC weekday afternoon variety show Where the Action Is, the first active, charting band to take on such status.

Happening ‘68

After the show was canceled in 1967, the band continued its house band position on the ABC Saturday afternoon shows  Happening '68, and later It's Happening. Lead singer Mark Lindsay and Revere became the hosts of the shows while the rest of the band added slapstick comedy to the show.

Death
Revere continued with the band until mid-2014, when cancer forced his retirement. He left his son Jamie to continue the band's legacy. He died in Garden Valley, Idaho, on October 4, 2014, at age 76.

On October 10, 2014, at the Los Angeles Forum, Tom Petty performed "I'm Not Your Stepping Stone", dedicating it to Paul Revere, acknowledging his death that week.

References

External links
  Paul Revere and the Raiders official website

See Also
 Happening ‘68

1938 births
2014 deaths
Musicians from Boise, Idaho
American keyboardists
American bandleaders
American television hosts
American Mennonites
Deaths from cancer in Idaho
Paul Revere & the Raiders members